Nowa Brda is a former PKP railway station in Nowa Brda (Pomeranian Voivodeship), Poland.

References 

Nowa Brda Człuchowska article at Polish Stations Database, URL accessed at 7 March 2006

Railway stations in Pomeranian Voivodeship
Disused railway stations in Pomeranian Voivodeship
Człuchów County